Vendryes is a surname. Notable people with the surname include:

 Georges Vendryes (1920–2014), French physicist
 Joseph Vendryes (1875–1960), French Celtic linguist
 Margaret Rose Vendryes (1955–2022), American visual artist, curator, and art historian

French-language surnames